Scott Rand (born October 6, 1968 in Calgary, Alberta) is a Canadian rower. He competed in the adaptive rowing competition at the 2008 Summer Paralympics in Beijing. His team finished in 6th place.

See also
Glossary of rowing terms
List of rowing venues
List of world best times in rowing

References

External links

Canadian male rowers
Rowers at the 2008 Summer Paralympics
Sportspeople from Calgary
Living people
1968 births
21st-century Canadian people